State Route 186 (SR 186) is a  state highway in south central Maine.  The highway serves the town of Gouldsboro, running in a half-loop from U.S. Route 1 (US 1), south and east along the southern coast to Winter Harbor near Frenchman Bay, and then returning to US 1.

Major junctions

References

External links

Floodgap Roadgap's RoadsAroundME: State Route 186

186
Transportation in Hancock County, Maine